Gulfport Casino is a national historic site located at 5500 Shore Blvd., Gulfport, Florida in Pinellas County. Built at the end of the dock into the bay in 1906 as station and ticket office, the building contained a post office and a refreshment stand. The current building was reconstructed in the 1930s.

It was added to the National Register of Historic Places on August 8, 2014.

References

National Register of Historic Places in Pinellas County, Florida
1906 establishments in Florida